Live in Japan 2017: Escape + Frontiers is a live album by American rock band Journey, recorded in 2017 and released in 2019.

Track listing

Personnel
Journey
Neal Schon – lead guitar, backing vocals
Jonathan Cain – keyboards, piano, rhythm guitar, backing vocals
Ross Valory – bass, backing vocals
Arnel Pineda – lead vocals
Steve Smith – drums

Additional musician and production
Travis Thibodaux – keyboards, backing vocals, lead vocals
Kevin Elson – producer, engineer, mixing, live sound
Clifford Bonnell, Daniel Aumais, Guy Charbonneau, Akira Fukuda, Tom Suzuki – live recordings assistant engineers
Wally Buck – studio recording assistant engineer
Bob Ludwig – mastering

References 

2019 live albums
Journey (band) live albums